The Clash were an English rock band that formed in 1976 as part of the original wave of British punk rock.  Along with punk rock, they experimented with reggae, ska, dub, funk, rap and rockabilly.  For most of their recording career, The Clash consisted of Joe Strummer (lead vocals, rhythm guitar), Mick Jones (lead guitar, vocals), and Paul Simonon (bass, backing vocals, occasional lead vocals), with Terry Chimes or Nicky "Topper" Headon on drums and percussion.  The band features in several documentaries and other films.

See also

 The Clash discography
 List of The Clash songs

Notes

The Clash